Salamandastron is a fantasy novel by Brian Jacques, published in 1992. It is the fifth book published and eighth chronologically in the Redwall series.

Plot introduction
Ferahgo the Assassin, a terrible weasel warlord, and his son Klitch lead their army of Corpsemakers to Salamandastron, to take over from the Badger Lord, Urthstripe the Strong. Meanwhile, at Redwall Abbey, two stoats run off with the Sword of Martin the Warrior after accidentally killing Brother Hal with a bow and arrow left out from a carnival the night before, and young Samkim, a mischievous squirrel, and his partner Arula the molemaid set off to claim back the sword. As the young squirrel and mole attempt to restore the symbolic weapon, a deadly fever ravages Redwall Abbey. The only hope to stop the disease is an otter named Thrugg and his partner, young Dumble the dormouse. At the same time, Mara the badgermaid leaves Salamandastron with Pikkle Ffolger, her friend the gluttonous hare, only to be tricked by Feragho's son Klitch and his lackey, Goffa. The two join forces with the Guerilla Union of South Stream Shrews of Mossflower (Guosssom) to take the Blackstone from the mysterious badger ghost.

Plot summary
The book follows the tale of the Badger Lord Urthstripe the Strong and his battle against Ferahgo the Assassin. Mara, Urthstripe's young adopted daughter, and her hare friend, Pikkle, decide to leave the great mountain stronghold, Mara having become tired of the strict ways of Salamandastron.

Meanwhile, two stoats, Dingeye and Thura, have recently deserted Ferahgo's army. They manage to find their way to Redwall Abbey and are taken in by the kind beasts that reside there. While tensions mount as to their presence, the ruling beasts of the Abbey decide they may stay: the two stoats, while rude, have done no harm.

Mara and Pikkle, meanwhile, have escaped Ferahgo's horde and have taken refuge in a cave. Unfortunately, the cave is inhabited by a sand lizard called Swinkee. A fight ensues, and Mara accidentally pulls off Swinkee's tail. After the fight, Mara and Pikkle ask Swinkee if he can take them to Salamandastron. To get Swinkee to do it, they promise him a large bag of live swampflies and marshworms. Swinkee double-crosses them, however, and leads them straight to a tribe of cannibal toads. They are presented to the chieftain, a large, repulsive, fat toad called King Glagweb. He throws them into a pit where 36 young shrews are kept captive as well, one of these is Nordo, son of Log-a-Log of the Guosssom (Guerilla Union Of South Stream Shrews of Mossflower). The shrews explain what the toads are going to do to them and their escape plan. Later, when they are nearing a feast day, a black acorn drops into the pit, signalling the captives to throw whatever they have at the toads. After a few minutes of hard fighting, Log-a-Logs shrews come and free the captives while fighting and killing the toads. Mara attacks Glagweb, only to be stopped by Log-a-Log, who throws Glagweb into the prison pit, along with a large, healthy, young pike. Later, Log-a-Log asks a boon of Pikkle and Mara, asking them help in retrieving the Blackstone, the symbol of leadership among the Guosssom. He explains he had been ruling only through sheer strength, and that a badger ghost had taken the stone. The trip to the island was treacherous because of the appearance of the Deepcoiler, a large monster residing in the lake that terrorises the Guosssom, along with a conspiracy against Log-a-log launched by a shrew named Tubgutt. When Mara and Pikkle and the Guosssom reach the island, they delve into the islands forest, meeting the 'ghost' badger, who is really a living badger named Urthwyte, the long-lost brother of Mara's father, Urthstripe, and Urthstripes' mother and Mara's grandmother, Loambudd.

Meanwhile, a young squirrel named Samkim and his good mole friend Arula are wreaking havoc, as will happen with youngbeasts. They start playing with bows and arrows and frighten one of the Redwall abbey dwellers. One night, a lightning bolt strikes the weathervane of Redwall, and the sword of Martin the Warrior falls from its resting place high above the Abbey grounds and falls at the feet of Samkim, who is dumbfounded by his discovery.

Dingeye and Thura's stay is cut short when they are forced to flee the Abbey after accidentally killing one of the Redwallers (Brother Hal) with the same bows and arrows that Samkim and Arula had used. Dingeye and Thura head towards the countryside, with Martin's stolen sword in hand. Samkim and Arula pursue the two beasts, intent on not only rescuing the legendary sword of their Abbey Champion, but exacting vengeance upon the murdering vermin. Thura falls dead from Dryditch fever, and is left behind by Dingeye. His body is discovered by Samkin, Furgle the Hermit, and Arula. Furgle recognises the disease symptoms and goes to warn Redwall. Dingeye, however, is caught by a group of six vermin from Ferahgo's horde, and is beheaded with the Sword of Martin the Warrior. The vermin leader is Dethbrush, and he in turn takes the Sword from Dingeye's headless carcass.

Back at Redwall, a terrible disease has begun ravaging the Abbey. A local woodvole hermit by the name of Furgle determines that it is Dryditch Fever. Mrs. Faith Spinney mentioned that there is an old wives' tale saying that the Flowers of Icetor from the Mountains of the North boiled in springwater can cure Dryditch Fever, so the brave otter Thrugg sets off to find them. With the dormouse babe Dumble along for the ride and an injured falcon whom they meet on the road named Rocangus, the trio eventually makes it to the pines where a group of crows terrorise any passerby. After being rescued by Laird McTalon and a group of falcons, Thrugg succeeds in securing the flowers from the ruler of the mountain: the mighty Golden Eagle, Wild King MacPhearsome.

Mara and Samkin's paths eventually cross when Samkin catches up with Dethbrush in a storm and punches him overboard. He is in turn eaten by the Deepcoiler. Samkin grabs the Sword of Martin the Warrior from the body of Dethbrush before the Deepcoiler can dive. Then, after the Deepcoiler dove, it rose again, attacking Spriggat. Then, when the serpent has Spriggat in its jaws, Samkin stabs the Deepcoiler in the roof of the mouth. The serpent then vanishes. Later, Mara and the Guosim find the body of Deepcoiler and retrieve the Sword from it. Along their way, they meet each other and Mara gives Samkin the Sword. Heading back to Salamandastron, the group arrives to see Salamandastron being sieged by Ferahgo the Assassin, and soon enough in time to find Urthstripe seized by the Bloodwrath, leaping from the towering mountain with Ferahgo in his grasp. After the battle, Ferahgo's son, Klitch, is still trapped within Salamandastron. After wandering some way, he gets thirsty and thinks that it is his 'Lucky Day' when he finds some barrels of water. He has forgotten the fact that the Poisoner, hired by Ferahgo, has poisoned all the food and water he saw while on his last mission before his death. Klitch drinks the dregs, and is eventually beset by lances of pain and numbness. He wedges himself on a mountainside opening, and dies of the powerful poison. After Urthstripe's death, Mara, Pikkle, Samkin, Arula, Urthwyte and Loambudd find the badger treasure that Ferahgo was looking for and bury him there.

Soon after Thrugg, Dumble and MacPhearsome return with the haversack full of the flowers of Icetor, Samkim and Arula, along with Mara and Pikkle, return to Redwall Abbey. The Abbey is cured of the fever and soon, nameday comes upon the abbey. Mara becomes the Badger Mother of Redwall. Urthwyte remains behind as Lord of Salamandastron, along with the surviving members of the Long Patrol.

Characters in Salamandastron

Urthstripe the Strong
Ferahgo the Assassin
Mara
Wild King MacPhearsome
Urthwyte the Mighty
Loambudd
Tubgutt
Dingeye
Thura
Furgle the Hermit
Mrs. Faith Spinney
The Long Patrol
Windpaw
Big Oxeye (Lieutenant)
Sergeant Sapwood
Bart Thistledown
Moonpaw
Seawood
Shorebuck
Starbob
Catkin
Pennybright
Lingfur
Barfle
Migroo
Raptail
Dethbrush
Brother Hal
Thrugg
Thrugann
Ashnin
Clarissa
Brother Hollyberry
Farran the Poisoner
Log-a-Log
Nordo (Log-a-Log's son)
Sister Nasturtium
Bremmun
Arula
Samkim
King Glagweb
Goffa
Swinkee
Clarence
Sickear
Alfoh
Abbess Vale
Forgrin
Laird Mactalon
Tammbeak
Rocangus

Book divisions (English) 
Book 1: Questors and Runaways
Book 2: Warriors and Monsters
Book 3: Destinies and Homecomers

Translations
(Finnish) Salamandastronin aarre
(French) Rougemuraille : Salamandastron
Tome 1 : Ferrago l'Assassin
Tome 2 : La Fièvre du fossé tari
Tome 3 : Le Serpentissime
Tome 4 : Mara de Rougemuraille
(German) Die Jagd nach dem Schatz
Von Abenteurern und Ausreißern
Von Kriegern und Ungeheurern
Von Shicksalen und Heimkehrern
(Russian) old version – Мара, или Война с Горностаем, new version – Саламандастрон
Беглецы и искатели
Воины и чудовища
Живые и мертвые

References

External links 
 Plot summary

Fictional badgers
Children's fantasy novels
British children's novels
British fantasy novels
Redwall books
1992 British novels
1992 fantasy novels
Hutchinson (publisher) books
1992 children's books